The Augustusburg Cable Railway is a funicular railway in Saxony, Germany. It  connects the station of Erdmannsdorf-Augustusburg, in the village of Erdmannsdorf and on the Annaberg-Buchholz–Flöha railway, with the town of Augustusburg on the hill above.

The need for a line to connect Augustusburg with its railway station was identified in the 19th century, with the growth of local tourism, but negotiation for granting a franchise took some years. The franchise was finally granted in 1910, and the line was opened in 1911. The line has been overhauled and restored several times, including 1971–73, 1996 and 2005–2006. New cars were provided in 1996. The stations have been kept in their historical condition, and are on the list of national monuments.

The line has the following technical parameters:

Length: 
Height: 
Maximum Steepness: 20%
Cars: 2
Capacity: 77 passengers per car
Configuration: Single track with passing loop
Maximum speed: 
Track gauge: 
Journey time: 8 minutes
Traction: Electricity

The line is operated by Deutsche Bahn's subsidiary Erzgebirgsbahn, who also operate the nearby Annaberg-Buchholz–Flöha railway.

See also 
 List of funicular railways

References

External links
 
 Drahtseilbahn Augustusburg web site (in English)

Railway lines in Saxony
Augustusburg, Drahtseilbahn
Metre gauge railways in Germany
Railway lines opened in 1911
cable railway
1911 establishments in Germany